Caroline Thomas (1959 - 20 October 2008)  was an international relations academic and a leading authority on the politics of development. Her work In Search of Security was an early contribution to the 'widening' debate within security studies.

Selected works
 Global governance, development and human security : the challenge of poverty and inequality
 Global trade and global social issues
 In search of security : the Third World in international relations
 Globalization, human security, and the African experience
 New states, sovereignty, and intervention 
 Conflict and consensus in South/North security 
 Globalization and the South 
 The environment in international relations 
 Rio : unravelling the consequences
 The State and instability in the South

See also
Third World Security School

References

1959 births
2008 deaths
Security studies
Academics of the University of Southampton